February 2015

See also

References

 02
February 2015 events in the United States